Robert F. Castellvi is a retired United States Marine Corps major general who most recently served as Inspector General of the Marine Corps from 9 October 2020 to 1 May 2021. As Inspector General, Castellvi oversaw matters of institutional integrity, discipline and combat readiness in the Corps, maintaining credibility through impartial and independent inspections, assessments, inquiries, investigations, teaching, and training. He is also an ex-officio Member at the North Carolina Military Affairs Full Commission in Camp Lejeune, Jacksonville, North Carolina.

As of 1 May 2021, Castellvi was suspended from serving as the Inspector General of the Marine Corps pending the outcome of an investigation into an AAV mishap while he was commanding general of the 1st Marine Division.

Military career

Castellvi was commissioned into the Marine Corps via the NROTC program in February 1984.

Castellvi participated in Operation Earnest Will in the Persian Gulf with the 24th Marine Expeditionary Unit in 1985, Operation Inherent Resolve as the deputy commanding general for operations, Operation RESTORE HOPE, and Operation Desert Storm.

On 22 March 2017, then-Secretary of Defense Jim Mattis nominated Robert F. Castellvi to the rank of Major General while he was deputy commanding general of the II Marine Expeditionary Force (dual-hatted as 2 MEB commander). He was confirmed by the Senate on 1 May 2017. He was the commander of Marine Corps Installations East from 12 July 2013 to 31 July 2015, and was succeeded by Major General Thomas D. Weidley. He was also a director of the Manpower Management Division.

He was formerly the commanding officer of the 2nd Marine Expeditionary Brigade and then the 1st Marine Division, succeeding Eric M. Smith. He served as commanding general of the 1st Marines from 6 July 2018 to 22 September 2020, passing the baton to Major General Roger B. Turner Jr. While serving as the commanding general of the 1st Marine Division, Castellvi relieved Lt. Col. Francisco Zavala, the commanding officer of the 1st Reconnaissance Battalion. Castellvi relieved Zavala on May 7, 2019 for "loss of trust and confidence" in the commander's ability to lead the battalion.

Suspension

Castellvi was suspended from all current duties on 1 May 2021 on orders from David H. Berger, Commandant of the Marine Corps, based on an investigation into his responsibility for an AAV mishap at Camp Pendleton, when 8 Marines and a Navy Corpsman drowned in a preventable "accident" on July 30, 2020. An investigation is still being conducted on culpability.

In June 2021, Marine spokespersons reported that Castellvi had been permanently relieved of duty as Inspector General and counselled by the Commandant, rendering him likely ineligible for promotion to higher rank.

Education
Major General Castellvi is a graduate of the University of Illinois where he earned his Marine Corps commission through the NROTC program. He is also a graduate of the U.S. Army Infantry Officer Advance Course, Marine Corps Command and Staff College, The School of Advanced Warfighting, as well as the Industrial College of the Armed Forces. Castellvi also earned Master's Degrees from the Marine Corps University, the National Defense University, and Capitol College.

Awards and decorations

Major General Robert F. Castellvi is the recipient of the following awards:

1993 recipient of the Leftwich Trophy for leadership
Combat Action Ribbon with one Gold Star
Defense Superior Service Medal
Legion of Merit with one Gold Star
Bronze Star Medal with V device
Meritorious Service Medal with three Gold Stars
Marine Corps Commendation Medal
Army Commendation Medal
 US Marine Corps Achievement Medal with two Gold Stars

References

External links

Official biography of Major General Robert F. Castellvi at 1st Marine Division

Year of birth missing (living people)
Living people
University of Illinois alumni
United States Marine Corps generals
Marine Corps University alumni
National Defense University alumni
1st Marine Division (United States)
Operation Inherent Resolve